Republic of Azerbaijan women's national under-17 football team represents Azerbaijan in international youth football competitions.

FIFA U-17 Women's World Cup

The team has qualified in 2012

UEFA Women's Under-17 Championship

The team has never qualified

Previous squads
2012 FIFA U-17 Women's World Cup

See also
Azerbaijan women's national football team
Azerbaijan women's national under-20 football team

References

External links
 Football Federation of Azerbaijan

Under
Women's national under-17 association football teams